Old Kent Road was a railway station on the London, Brighton and South Coast Railway line in south London. It took its name from the Old Kent Road on which it was located.

History
The station opened on 13 August 1866. 

It was located on a viaduct to the south of Old Kent Road in the Peckham division of the parish of Camberwell. The boundary with the hamlet of Hatcham in the parish of St Paul Deptford was located just to the east of the station. The railway crossed the road on a bridge. To the north of Old Kent Road was a series of junctions connecting to Rotherhithe station on South London Line and Deptford Road station on the East London Railway. To the south the next station was Queen's Road.

The station was renamed in 1870 to Old Kent Road and Hatcham. The passenger train service to East London was withdrawn on 1 June 1911 and the track was removed in 1912. The station closed temporarily on 1 January 1917 during the First World War as an economy measure, but was never reopened after the end of the war.

Future
The reopening of the spur from Old Kent Road Junction to the East London Line in December 2012 allowed through services, as part of London Overground, a century after they were withdrawn. A new station named  is proposed to be situated about 700 metres north of the site of the former Old Kent Road station.

References

Railway stations in Great Britain opened in 1866
Railway stations in Great Britain closed in 1917
Former London, Brighton and South Coast Railway stations
Disused railway stations in the London Borough of Southwark
1866 establishments in England